Colombia is a transcontinental country largely situated in the northwest of South America, with territories in Central America. Colombia shares a border to the northwest with Panama, to the east with Venezuela and Brazil and to the south with Ecuador and Peru. It shares its maritime limits with Costa Rica, Nicaragua, Honduras, Jamaica, the Dominican Republic and Haiti. It is a unitary, constitutional republic comprising thirty-two departments.

Colombia is the third most populous country in Latin America. Its major industries include textiles, food processing, petroleum, clothing and footwear, consumer appliances, beverages, chemicals, cement, automobiles, gold, coal, and emeralds

For further information on the types of business entities in this country and their abbreviations, see "Business entities in Colombia".

Notable firms 
This list includes notable companies with primary headquarters located in the country. The industry and sector follow the Industry Classification Benchmark taxonomy. Organizations which have ceased operations are included and noted as defunct.

See also 
 Bolsa de Valores de Colombia
 Superintendency of Corporations

References 

 
Lists of companies by country